The Buddy Holly Story, Vol. II is the fifth album released by Buddy Holly, a sequel compilation to The Buddy Holly Story (1959).  The second album to be released posthumously, it is also the first of a series of Buddy Holly albums to feature overdubbing of unfinished tracks, including Holly's last original compositions.

"Little Baby" was originally from Holly's eponymous solo album, "Now We're One" was originally the B-side to "Early in the Morning", and "Take Your Time" was the B-Side to "Rave On!". The remaining tracks were unfinished acoustic demos recorded by Holly in 1959 that were overdubbed by Jack Hansen. Three singles from these sessions were released; "Peggy Sue Got Married", "Learning the Game", and "That Makes it Tough". "Moondreams" was also previously unreleased.

Track listing

Charts

Album

References

External links

Buddy Holly compilation albums
1960 compilation albums
Coral Records albums
Albums produced by Norman Petty
Compilation albums published posthumously
Sequel albums